I'm with You may refer to:

Albums
 I'm with You (album), by the Red Hot Chili Peppers, 2011 
I'm with You World Tour, a tour for the album
 I'm with You World Tour (EP), 2014
I'm with You Sessions, a series of previously unreleased songs from the album's sessions
 I'm with You, by Delbert McClinton, 1990
 I'm with You, by Sadao Watanabe, 2015

Songs
"I'm with You" (Avril Lavigne song), 2002
 "I'm with You" (Vance Joy song), 2018
 "I'm with You", by Wally Lewis, 1958 
 "I'm with You", by the "5" Royales, 1960
 "I'm with You", by the Big Three, 1963 
 "I'm with You", by Tommy Hunt, 1963
 "I'm with You", by the Stills from Oceans Will Rise, 2008 
 "I'm with You", by Bon Jovi from What About Now, 2013

See also
 I Am with You (disambiguation)
 I'm with You Always, a 1977 live album by Mike Bloomfield